The Black Reel Award for Outstanding Director is an award presented annually by the Black Reel Awards (BRA). It is given in honor of a film director who has exhibited outstanding directing while working in the film industry.

Director, Malcolm D. Lee took home the first award for The Best Man at the 1st Annual Black Reel Awards.

The Black Reel Awards for Outstanding Director and Black Reel Award for Outstanding Film has been closely linked throughout their history. Out of the 22 films that have been awarded Outstanding Film, 10 have also been awarded Outstanding Director.

Since its inception, the award has been given to 18 directors or directing teams. Ava DuVernay, Ryan Coogler, Gina Prince-Bythewood, Jordan Peele & Steve McQueen (director) has received the most awards in this category with two. Spike Lee has been nominated eleven times, more than any other individual. At age 29, Ryan Coogler became the youngest director to win this award for his work on Creed. Thomas Carter holds the record for the oldest director to win at 52 for Coach Carter.

Brothers, Albert Hughes & Allen Hughes are the only directing team to share this award. The pair won for The Book of Eli at the 11th Annual Black Reel Awards. Gina Prince-Bythewood became the first woman to be nominated and win in this category for Love & Basketball.

Winners and nominees
Winners are listed first and highlighted in bold.

2000s

2010s

2020s

Multiple nominations and wins

Multiple wins
 3 Wins
 Gina Prince-Bythewood

 2 Wins
 Ryan Coogler
 Ava DuVernay
 Steve McQueen
 Jordan Peele

Multiple Nominees

 11 Nominations
 Spike Lee

6 Nominations
 Antoine Fuqua
 Malcolm D. Lee

 4 Nominations
 Gina Prince-Bythewood
 John Singleton

 3 Nominations
 Ryan Coogler
 Ava DuVernay
 Albert Hughes
 Allen Hughes
 Steve McQueen
 Tim Story

 2 Nominations
 Salim Akil
 Thomas Carter
 Lee Daniels
 Rick Famuyiwa
 F. Gary Gray
 Sanaa Hamri
 Gary Hardwick
 Barry Jenkins
 Jordan Peele
 Dee Rees
 Charles Stone III
 George Tillman Jr.
 Denzel Washington

Age superlatives

Diversity of Nominees

Female nominees/winners
Seventeen female directors have been nominated for a total twenty-three times in this category, and three have won the award.

2001 - Gina Prince-Bythewood for Love & Basketball‡
2007 - Sanaa Hamri for Something New
2008 - Gina Prince-Bythewood for The Secret Life of Bees†
2008 - Darnell Martin for Cadillac Records‡
2011 - Tanya Hamilton for Night Catches Us‡
2011 - Sanaa Hamri for Just Wright†
2012 - Ava DuVernay for I Will Follow
2012 - Dee Rees for Pariah†
2013 - Ava DuVernay for Middle of Nowhere†
2015 - Ava DuVernay for Selma‡
2015 - Amma Asante for Belle†
2015 - Gina Prince-Bythewood for Beyond the Lights†
2018 - Maggie Betts for Novitiate
2018 - Dee Rees for Mudbound †
2020 - Mati Diop for Atlantics
2020 - Kasi Lemmons for Harriet
2020 - Melina Matsoukas for Queen & Slim †
2021 - Regina King for One Night in Miami... †
2021 - Radha Blank for The Forty-Year-Old Version
2021 - Channing Godfrey Peoples for Miss Juneteenth
2022 - Halle Berry for Bruised
2022 - Nia DaCosta for Candyman
2022 - Rebecca Hall for Passing †
2023 - Gina Prince-Bythewood for The Woman King
2023 - Chinonye Chukwu for Till (film)

Documentary nominees/winners
Three directors of a documentary film have been nominated in this category.

2001 - Albert Hughes & Allen Hughes for American Pimp
2005 - Antoine Fuqua for Lightning in a Bottle

Animated nominees/winners
One director of an animated film have been nominated in this category.

2013 - Peter Ramsey for Rise of the Guardians

Non-English language nominees/winners
One director of a non-English film has been nominated in this category.

2020 - Mati Diop for Atlantics, Wolof & French

bold — Indicates winner 
† — Film nominated for Outstanding Film 
‡ — Film won for Outstanding Film

References

Black Reel Awards